Frederick William Freking (August 11, 1913 – November 28, 1998) was an American prelate of the Roman Catholic Church who served as bishop of the Diocese of Salina, in Kansas (1957–1964) and bishop of the Diocese of La Crosse in Wisconsin (1964–1983).

Biography

Early life and education
Freking was born in Heron Lake, Minnesota, one of nineteen children of August and Rosa (née Oberbroeckling) Freking. He received his early education at the parochial school of Sacred Heart Parish, and then attended Heron Lake Public High School. 

In 1934, Freking earned a Bachelor of Arts degree from St. Mary's College in Winona. He completed his studies in philosophy and theology in Rome, at the Pontifical North American College and the Pontifical Gregorian University. He earned a Bachelor of Sacred Theology degree in 1937.

Priesthood and ministry
On July 31, 1938, Freking was ordained to the priesthood for the Diocese of Winona in Rome by Archbishop Luca Pasetto. Following his return to Minnesota, he served as a curate in Winona, Dakota, and La Moille, and as editor of the diocesan newspaper before continuing his studies at the Catholic University of America in Washington, D.C. He there earned a Doctor of Canon Law degree in 1948. Freking became diocesan chancellor in 1952. From 1953 to 1957, he served as spiritual director of the North American College.

Bishop of Salina
On October 10, 1957, Freking was appointed the fifth Bishop of Salina by Pope Pius XII. He received his episcopal consecration on  November 30, 1957, from Cardinal Giuseppe Pizzardo, with Archbishops Luigi Traglia and Martin O'Connor serving as co-consecrators, in Rome. His installation took place at Sacred Heart Cathedral in Salina, Kansas, on January 8, 1958. Early in his tenure in Salina, Freking founded the Salina Council of Catholic Women in 1958 and Catholic Charities of Salina the following year. He convoked the first diocesan synod in 1962.

Freking attended all four sessions of the Second Vatican Council in Rome from 1962 through 1965. As bishop of Salina, he established seven new churches, eleven new convents, four new high schools, and seven new grade schools. He also expanded the diocesan Charity and Religion Fund to assist the parishes in financing their construction and renovation projects.

Bishop of La Crosse
On December 30, 1964, Freking was appointed the sixth bishop of the Diocese of La Crosse by Pope Paul VI. He was installed on February 24, 1965. From 1964 to 1966, he headed the National Catholic Rural Life Conference. During his tenure in La Crosse, he reduced the diocese's debt from $11 million to $4 million between 1965 and 1981. He established a diocesan commission on Christian renewal in 1965, and the first lay ministry training program in the United States in 1975.

Freking also oversaw construction of 14 churches, 15 rectories, seven elementary schools, 22 religious education centers, five convents and the Newman Center. Freking also supervised 36 church renovations and expansions, and 59 priests were ordained while he was bishop. He was instrumental in the founding of the Bethany-St. Joseph Care Center for the elderly by the diocese and the Lutheran Church in La Crosse.

On May 10, 1983, Pope John Paul II accepted Freking's resignation as bishop of the Diocese of La Crosse. Frederick Freking, who long suffered from respiratory problems, died from complications of emphysema at the Franciscan Skemp Medical Center in La Crosse at age 85.

See also

 Catholic Church hierarchy
 Catholic Church in the United States
 Historical list of the Catholic bishops of the United States
 List of Catholic bishops of the United States
 Lists of patriarchs, archbishops, and bishops

References

External links
Roman Catholic Diocese of La Crosse
Roman Catholic Diocese of Salina
Roman Catholic Diocese of Winona

1913 births
1998 deaths
Catholic University of America alumni
Roman Catholic Diocese of Winona-Rochester
Roman Catholic bishops of Salina
Participants in the Second Vatican Council
People from Jackson County, Minnesota
20th-century Roman Catholic bishops in the United States
Roman Catholic bishops of La Crosse
Religious leaders from Minnesota
Catholics from Minnesota